Robert Michael Maitland Stewart, Baron Stewart of Fulham,  (6 November 1906 – 10 March 1990) was a British Labour Party politician, life peer and Fabian Socialist who was a Member of Parliament for 34 years, and served twice as Foreign Secretary in the first cabinet of Harold Wilson.

Early life
The son of Robert Wallace Stewart, author and lecturer, and Eva Stewart née Blaxley, Stewart was born in Bromley and educated at Brownhill Road Elementary School, Catford, Christ's Hospital and St. John's College, Oxford, where he graduated with a first class BA in Philosophy, Politics and Economics in 1929. Whilst at Oxford he was involved in student politics and was elected as President of the Oxford Union for Michaelmas Term 1929. He was also the president of St John's Labour Club that same year.

Stewart began his career as an official in the Royal Household during 1931. He worked for a short period with the Secretariat of the League of Nations, before becoming a schoolmaster, first at the Merchant Taylors' School in London, then at Coopers' Company's School, Mile End, and then at Frome, Somerset. During World War II, Stewart served in the Middle East, joining the Intelligence Corps in 1942, before transferring to the Army Educational Corps in 1943. He was promoted to captain in 1944.

On 26 July 1941 he married Mary Birkinshaw, later Baroness Stewart of Alvechurch; they had no children. They were one of the few couples who both held titles in their own right.

Political career
Stewart had contested the Lewisham West constituency in 1931 and 1935, and Fulham East in 1936; after the war he became MP for Fulham East 1945–55, then for Fulham 1955–74, and Hammersmith, Fulham 1974–79. Soon after his initial election, he was made one of the Lords Commissioners of the Treasury (more commonly known as a junior whip), then a junior minister, as Under-Secretary of State for War (1947–51) and later as Parliamentary Secretary to the Ministry of Supply (May–October 1951). Following Labour's defeat in the 1951 election, Stewart was a rising figure on the shadow front bench, serving as Shadow Minister of Education (1955–59) and then as Shadow Minister of Housing and Local Government (1959–64).

Stewart was Fabian Summer School director in 1952 and lecturer in 1954. He was Fabian New Year School lecturer in 1954–55 and publicist in 1956.  He is listed as a member of the Fabian Society International Bureau Committee during 1957–58 and was mentioned in Fabian News November – December 1964 as a former member of the Fabian Executive Committee.

Government 1964–70
When Harold Wilson became Prime Minister in 1964, Stewart was appointed Secretary of State for Education and Science. He was promoted to Secretary of State for Foreign Affairs in January 1965 after his predecessor Patrick Gordon Walker's bid to regain a House of Commons seat in the 1965 Leyton by-election failed. He was described by the press as relatively unknown to the public but was extremely well known within Fabian socialist circles. He became Secretary of State for Economic Affairs in 1966. From 1966 to 1968, he was First Secretary of State. He returned to the Foreign Office from 1968 to 1970.  As foreign secretary, he was instrumental in supplying arms to support the Nigerian military dictatorship's crushing of the secessionist Republic of Biafra in the Nigerian Civil War (when up to one million people died), later saying "It would have been quite easy for me to say: This is going to be difficult – let's cut off all connexion with the Nigerian Government. If I'd done that I should have known that I was encouraging in Africa the principle of tribal secession – with all the misery that could bring to Africa in the future."

Post-Government
A committed pro-European, Stewart was leader of the Labour Delegation to the Council of Europe in June 1970, and joint president of the Labour Committee for Europe with George Brown and Roy Jenkins. He served as a member of the European Parliament from 1975 to 1976.

Stewart was a supporter of a United Ireland, supporting a peaceful resolution to the partition of Ireland.

Stewart was made a member of the Privy Council in 1964. He was appointed a Companion of Honour (CH) in the 1969 New Year Honours. He retired from the House of Commons in 1979. He was elevated to the House of Lords, being created a life peer with the title Baron Stewart of Fulham, of Fulham in Greater London, on 5 July 1979.

He died in 1990, aged 83.

References

Bibliography
The Forty Hour Week (Fabian Society), (1936)
Bias and Education for Democracy (1937)
The British Approach to Politics (1938)
Policy and weapons in the nuclear age (1955)
Modern Forms of Government (1959)
An incomes policy for Labour (1963)
Fabian Freeway Rose L. Martin (1966)
Labour and the economy : a socialist strategy (1972)
Life and Labour (1980) – his autobiography
European Security: the case against unilateral nuclear disarmament (1981)

External links 

 
The Papers of Lord Stewart of Fulham and Baroness Stewart of Alvechurch held at Churchill Archives Centre

1906 births
1990 deaths
British Secretaries of State
British Secretaries of State for Education
British Secretaries of State for Foreign Affairs
British Secretaries of State for Foreign and Commonwealth Affairs
Labour Party (UK) MPs for English constituencies
British Army personnel of World War II
Intelligence Corps officers
Royal Army Educational Corps officers
Presidents of the Oxford Union
People educated at Christ's Hospital
Stewart of Fulham, Michael Stewart, Baron
Members of the Privy Council of the United Kingdom
National Union of Teachers-sponsored MPs
Alumni of St John's College, Oxford
People from Bromley
First Secretaries of State of the United Kingdom
Members of the Order of the Companions of Honour
Spouses of life peers
UK MPs 1945–1950
UK MPs 1950–1951
UK MPs 1951–1955
UK MPs 1955–1959
UK MPs 1959–1964
UK MPs 1964–1966
UK MPs 1966–1970
UK MPs 1970–1974
UK MPs 1974
UK MPs 1974–1979
Labour Party (UK) MEPs
MEPs for the United Kingdom 1973–1979
Members of the Fabian Society
Schoolteachers from London
Ministers in the Attlee governments, 1945–1951
Ministers in the Wilson governments, 1964–1970
Schoolteachers from Somerset
Military personnel from Kent
Life peers created by Elizabeth II